Angel Rodriguez was a boxer that competed at the 1920 Summer Olympics in the featherweight division. He was defeated by Arthur Olsen in the round of 32. He was the only Argentinian athlete to participate in these games.

See also
Argentina at the 1920 Summer Olympics

References

External links
 
 

Olympic boxers of Argentina
Boxers at the 1920 Summer Olympics
Year of birth missing
Year of death missing
Argentine male boxers
Featherweight boxers